St Matthias’ Church is a small Gothic Revival Anglican church located in Ballydehob, County Cork, Ireland. It was completed in 1829. It is dedicated to Saint Matthias. Along with Saint Matthew's Church in Aughadown, it is part of the Ballydehob Union of Parishes in the Diocese of Cork, Cloyne, and Ross.

History 
St Matthias’ Church was opened and consecrated in 1829. It was funded by a loan from the Board of First Fruits, and was likely designed by architect Joseph Welland. The chancel was added around 1852.

Originally a chapel of Ease for Holy Trinity Church in Schull, it was separated from Schull parish in roughly 1869. Following the split, the church was extended by architects Welland & Gillespie. In the 1860s it was further extended, with the 1829 building now forming the centre of a larger construction.

Steve McCann currently serves as rector of the parish.

Architecture 
The chapel feature an octagonal marble baptismal font, created in 1888, which rests on red marble colonnettes. The east window depicts Jesus Christ as the Light of the World in stained-glass, and was made by Clokey & Co in 1945. It is dedicated to the memory of Joe Young.

References

Notes

Sources 

 
 

Architecture in Ireland
Churches in the Diocese of Cork, Cloyne and Ross
19th-century Church of Ireland church buildings
Gothic Revival church buildings in the Republic of Ireland
19th-century churches in the Republic of Ireland